The Fierce-fire Oil Cabinet (Chinese: 猛火油櫃 měng huǒ yóu guì) was a double-piston pump naphtha flamethrower first recorded to have been used in 919 AD in China, during the Five Dynasties and Ten Kingdoms period.

Wu Renchen and Khitan Liao dynasty 
Petroleum had been used in China since the late Zhou dynasty in 5th century BC, but the distilled fierce fire oil, otherwise known as petrol or Greek fire in the west, was not used until the 10th century AD. According to Wu Renchen's Spring and Autumn Annals of the Ten Kingdoms, in 917 AD, the king of Wuyue sent fierce fire oil to the Khitans as a gift. The envoy explained that it could be used to attack cities and the Khitan ruler was delighted.

The History of Liao gives an extended version of the account:

Qian Chuanguan 
According to the Wu-Yue Beishi (吳越備史, "The History of Wu and Yue"), the next appearance of fierce fire oil occurred in 919 AD when the two fleets of Wuyue and Wu met in battle. In the Battle of Langshan Jiang (Wolf Mountain River), the Wuyue fleet under Qian Chuanguan brought with them more than 500 dragon-like battleships and used "fire oil" to burn the enemy fleet. It was a great victory and they destroyed more than 400 enemy ships as well as capturing more than 7,000 men. The text goes on to explain appearance of the new weapon and the device used to deploy it:

Wujing Zongyao 
Joseph Needham believes that If the flamethrower used in 919 AD was of the same design as the one described in the later Wujing Zongyao in 1044, then it is also by implication the earliest known use of the slow match. Therefore, also one of the first military applications of gunpowder. The following is a description of the flamethrower as provided by the Wujing Zongyao:

Flamethrowers were also recorded to have been used in 976 AD when Song naval forces confronted the Southern Tang fleet on the Changjiang. Southern Tang forces attempted to use flamethrowers against the Song navy, but were accidentally consumed by their own fire when violent winds swept in their direction. The flamethrower was a well known device by the 11th century when it was joked that Confucian scholars knew it better than the classics. Both gunpowder and the fierce fire oil were produced under the Arsenals Administration of the Song dynasty. In the early 12th century AD, Kang Yuzhi recorded his memories of military commanders testing out fierce oil fire on a small lakelet. They would spray it about on the opposite bank that represented the enemy camp. The flames would ignite into a sheet of flame, destroying the wooden fortifications, and even killing the water plants, fishes and turtles.

In 1126 AD, the Song dynasty used flamethrowers in an attempt to prevent the Jurchen Jin dynasty army from crossing the Yellow River. Illustrations and descriptions of mobile flamethrowers on four-wheel push carts were documented in the Wujing Zongyao, written in 1044 AD (its illustration redrawn in 1601 as well).

References

Bibliography
 .

Chinese inventions
Flamethrowers
Medieval weapons
Military history of the Song dynasty
Weapons of China